Bruce Andrew Cruse (born 26 April 1967) is an Australian former first-class cricketer who played for the Tasmanian Tigers from 1985 to 1992. Cruse emigrated to the UK in 1993 and after time at Lancashire County Cricket Club he began working for the ECB ECB in several roles and now acts as the Director of Facilities and Infrastructure. Cruse leads a programme that has delivered over 150 million pounds investment into the grassroots of English Cricket

See also
 List of Tasmanian representative cricketers

References

External links
 

1967 births
Living people
Australian cricket administrators
Australian cricketers
Australian emigrants to England
Cricketers from Launceston, Tasmania
Tasmania cricketers